Hutson is a surname. Notable people with the surname include:
 Curtis Hutson, American Baptist minister and newspaper editor
 Don Hutson, American football player
 Eyre Hutson, British colonial governor
 John Hutson, former chief Judge Advocate General of the US Navy
 Leroy Hutson, American musician
 Hutson (album), a 1975 album by Leroy Hutson
 Richard Hutson, early American judge and politician
 Robin Hutson, British hotelier
 Shaun Hutson, British horror writer
 Tracy Hutson, American actress and television personality
 Wihla Hutson (1901–2002), American organist, composer, and lyricist known for her collaborations with Alfred Burt

See also
 Hudson (disambiguation)
 Hotson
 Hodson (disambiguation)